The booster separation motors or BSMs on the Space Shuttle were relatively small rocket motors that separated the reusable solid rocket boosters (SRB) from the orbiter after SRB burnout. Eight booster separation motors were attached to each of the shuttle's two reusable solid rocket boosters, four on the forward frustum and four on the aft skirt.

The booster separation motors were produced by ATK Launch Systems Group, part of Alliant Techsystems (ATK) Inc., at their facility in Brigham City, Utah. Booster separation motors weighed  when loaded with propellant.

Northrop Grumman is now manufacturing the booster separation motors for the Space Launch System Boosters, part of the NASA Space Launch System (SLS) for the Artemis program.

For Ariane 5 and Ariane 6 a Norwegian-Finnish company Nammo manufactures booster separation motors.

References

Space Shuttle program